

Descriptions  
Melientha is a genus of plants in the family Opiliaceae described as a genus in 1888.

The genus contains only one known species, Melientha suavis, native to Southeast Asia (Mindanao, Sabah, Peninsular Malaysia, Thailand, Cambodia, Laos, Vietnam).

Varieties
 Melientha suavis subsp. macrocarpa Hiepko - Sabah
 Melientha suavis subsp. suavis - Mindanao, Peninsular Malaysia, Thailand, Cambodia, Laos, Vietnam

Uses 

In Vietnam, the plant is called Rau Sắng. It is considered a food delicacy.
In Thailand the plant is known as ผักหวานป่า (/phak waan paa/).  Its leaves are considered a food delicacy.

References

Opiliaceae
Monotypic Santalales genera
Flora of Indo-China
Flora of Malesia
Asian vegetables